Squawk Australia was a television business news program that aired every weekday at 6:00am Singapore/Hong Kong/Taiwan time on CNBC Asia.  It was broadcast live from CNBC Asia's Australia studio in Sydney, and anchored by Amanda Drury.  It was produced by CNBC Asia from Australia.  It was also seen in the United States on the CNBC World channel at 6:00pm ET (with Daylight Saving Time) or 5:00pm ET (without DST).  On Sundays, it was simulcasted on CNBC Europe at 22.00 UK time (without DST) or 23.00 CET time (with DST).

The show was filmed on the floor of the exchange in front of one of the largest videowalls in the Southern Hemisphere.

Jeffrey James was the original anchor of Squawk Australia until his departure from the network in October 2008.

It was announced in early 2010 that Squawk Australia will be cancelled as part of a programming revamp at the network on 14 June 2010. This is also due to the relocation of Karen Tso to Singapore, and Amanda Drury to CNBC headquarters in the U.S.

About the show
Squawk Australia premiered on CNBC Asia on 26 March 2007 as part of the Asia firm's significant programming overhaul. It replaced the first hour of Asia Squawk Box, which was then seen an hour later. The show looked ahead to the Australian trading day with locally based analysts and fund managers, as well as recapping overnight trade in the U.S. and providing currency and world news updates. Weather forecasts were provided by The Weather Channel (formerly NBC Weather Plus). CNBC reporter Sri Jegarajah frequently contributed to the program from Singapore.

The program was initially broadcast from a camera position in the General Electric offices near the Sydney Harbour Bridge as an interim measure. A move to a new studio in the Burns Philp building, opposite to the Australian Stock Exchange, took place in October 2007 as the network expanded its Australian output. This was three months later than originally planned.

Anchor change and program revamp
In August 2008, CNBC announced that Karen Tso from Channel Nine will be joining the network as its new Australia-based anchor.  She anchored Squawk Australia and provided market updates into all of CNBC's pan-Asian and Australian programming.

Tso debuted in October 2008 when she replaced original anchor Jeffrey James.  To coincide with the anchor change and program revamp, Squawk Australia also moved to a new studio.

The show was last anchored by Amanda Drury. Amanda was an anchor on two of CNBC Asia Pacific's signature morning business programs: Asia Squawk Box and CNBC’s Cash Flow. She has had 10 years' experience as a financial and business TV journalist in Singapore, Tokyo and New York, and was previously based in the CNBC Australia headquarters in Sydney.  She was reassigned to the network's US studios in 2010.

Market holidays
On days when Australian markets close for a holiday, but other Asian markets remain open, CNBC Asia pre-empts Squawk Australia, instead extending Asia Squawk Box to 4 hours, the longest time for the show ever.  This was first seen on 9 April 2007.

Cancellation
Squawk Australia was cancelled 11 June 2010, three days before Asia Squawk Box moved back to its new/old time slot (6am Singapore/Hong Kong Time).  Karen Tso was reassigned to Singapore at the time of this program's cancellation.  A year and a half later, in January 2012, Tso joined CNBC Europe as co-anchor of Squawk Box Europe.

Studio closes
The Australian studio center ceased operations on 9 October 2020.

See also
Asia Squawk Box
Squawk Box Europe
Squawk Box
Squawk on the Street (a CNBC US program anchored from the New York Stock Exchange, which follows a similar format)

References

Australian television news shows
CNBC World original programming
CNBC Europe original programming
CNBC Asia original programming
CNBC Australia original programming
Australian television talk shows
2007 Australian television series debuts
2010 Australian television series endings
Business-related television series
2007 Singaporean television series debuts
2010 Singaporean television series endings